Hatalov is a village and municipality in Michalovce District in the Kosice Region of eastern Slovakia.

History
In historical records the village was first mentioned in 1278.

Geography
The village lies at an altitude of 103 metres and covers an area of  (2020-06-30/-07-01).

Ethnicity
The population is almost entirely Slovak in ethnicity.

Government

The village relies on the tax and district offices, and fire brigade at Michalovce and the police force at Trhovište.

Culture
The village has a public library and a post office, a guesthouse and a food store.

Sports
The village has a football pitch.

Transport
The village has a railway station.

Genealogical resources

The records for genealogical research are available at the state archive "Statny Archiv in Presov, Slovakia"

 Roman Catholic church records (births/marriages/deaths): 1789-1906 (parish B)
 Greek Catholic church records (births/marriages/deaths): 1756-1904 (parish B)

See also
 List of municipalities and towns in Slovakia

References

External links
http://www.statistics.sk/mosmis/eng/run.html 
Surnames of living people in Hatalov

Villages and municipalities in Michalovce District
Zemplín (region)